Anna e i cinque (Italian: Anna and the Five) is an Italian comedy television series starring Sabrina Ferilli about a woman who is a nanny for a wealthy family by day and stripper by night.

See also
List of Italian television series

External links
 

Italian television series
Canale 5 original programming